Klaus Theiss (born 9 July 1963 in Nagold) is a German former professional footballer. He made a total of 146 appearances in the Bundesliga and 94 in the 2. Bundesliga during his playing career.

References
 

1963 births
Living people
People from Calw (district)
Sportspeople from Karlsruhe (region)
German footballers
Association football sweepers
Bundesliga players
2. Bundesliga players
Germany under-21 international footballers
Germany youth international footballers
Karlsruher SC players
Eintracht Frankfurt players
Hamburger SV players
Viktoria Aschaffenburg players
FC 08 Homburg players
Tennis Borussia Berlin players
Footballers from Baden-Württemberg